Yangjiaqiao Town is an urban town in Xiangtan County, Hunan Province, People's Republic of China.

Demographics 
 it had a population of 60,929.

Governance
The town is divided into 41 villages and three communities, the following areas: Jiguan Community, Dianzijie Community, Wangjiashan Community, Wushiba Village, Donghe Village, Jinqiao Village, Biyuan Village, Sanhe Village, Xinxiang Village, Longhua Village, Donggao Village, Jiaotuo Village, Jinxing Village, Bailuchong Village, Shiqi Village, Puziling Village, Meilin Village, Jiujiang Village, Zhanggongtang Village, Huawei Village, Jinlong Village, Xinhe Village, Fengshuqiao Village, Dengjiaba Village, Jinqi Village, Jinfeng Village, Yaozi Village, Hongping Village, Hongtuo Village, Kuangjia Village, Batuo Village, Xinfu Village, Zhengfu Village, Dukou Village, Fuxing Village, Diefu Village, Jinma Village, Jingzhou Village, Yanshan Village, Yanglu Village, Xihua Village, Yinhu Village, Yanping Village, and Liuhu Village.

History
Yangjiaqiao Town was built in 1995.

Geography
Jinqiao Reservoir, Longhua Reservoir, Quantang Reservoir and Gaoyetang Reservoir are located in the town.

Lieyanjin River flows through the town.

Economy
Agriculture is the primary occupation. Rice and pig are important products.

Education
15 primary schools and five Middle schools are located with the town.

Culture
Huaguxi is the most influential local theater.

References

External links

Divisions of Xiangtan County